The New Zealand's elite women's basketball team is affectionately known to their home fans as the Tall Ferns. The team has been coached by Guy Molloy since 2018. The assistant coaches are Aik Ho and Jody Cameron. The Tall Ferns have a FIBA world ranking of 34. The team includes both young and experienced Kiwi athletes, who are involved in a variety of leagues or colleges in the US, Australia and Europe. The Tall Ferns form once a year to represent their county.

Results

Summer Olympics
 2000 – 11th place
 2004 – 8th place
 2008 – 10th place

FIBA World Championship
 1994 – 15th place

Commonwealth Games
 2006 – 2nd place
 2018 – 3rd place

FIBA Asia Cup
 2017 – 6th place
 2019 – 5th place
 2021 – 5th place

Current squad
Roster for the 2021 FIBA Women's Asia Cup.

Notable past players
 Lisa Wallbutton, (2008 Olympic Games, 2006 Commonwealth Games)
 Leanne Walker, (1994 World Championship and 2000 & 2004 Olympic Games)
 Gina Farmer, (1994 World Championship and 2000 & 2004 Olympic Games)
 Tania Tupu, (1994 World Championship and 2000 & 2004 Olympic Games)
 Kirstin Daly-Taylor, (1994 World Championship and 2000 Olympic Games)
 Leone Patterson, (1994 World Championship and 2000 Olympic Games)
 Rebecca Cotton, (2000 & 2004 Olympic Games and 2006 Commonwealth Games)
 Donna Loffhagen, (2000 & 2004 Olympic Games and 2006 Commonwealth Games)
 Julie Ofsoski, (2000 & 2004 Olympic Games)
 Megan Compain, (2000 & 2004 Olympic Games)
 Sally Farmer, (2000 & 2004 Olympic Games)
 Aneka Kerr, (2004 & 2008 Olympic Games and 2006 Commonwealth Games)
 Angela Marino, (2004 & 2008 Olympic Games)

References

External links

FIBA profile

 
Women's national basketball teams
national